Peltula obscurans (common rock-olive) is a dark olive to dark gray squamulose lichen that grows on rock and soil in arid habitats around the world.  It may grow as a rosette of squamulous lobes, or with widely scattered lobes.  A single black apothecium may be centered on the lobe.  The apothecia disc turns reddish-brown when wet, which contrasts with the lobes that turn olive-green when wet.  It can be found in southern Europe, South America, southwestern North America, Africa, Asia, Australia, and Papua New Guinea.

References

Lichinomycetes
Lichen species
Lichens described in 1872
Lichens of Africa
Lichens of Asia
Lichens of Australia
Lichens of Europe
Lichens of North America
Lichens of New Guinea
Taxa named by William Nylander (botanist)